Ahmad Muhammad Saeed al-Atrushi (born 1947 in Atrush, Dohuk, Iraq) is a former Kurdish politician in Iraq. Until 2003 he was general-secretary of the left, anti-Barzani, pro-Iraqi wing of the Kurdistan Democratic Party (KDP). He followed Hashim Aqrawi, who had split up that KDP wing and joined the Baath-led National Progressive Front. In 2000 president Saddam Hussein appointed al-Atrushi for the constituency of Dohuk in the fifth legislative term of the National Assembly.

Sources
Kurdish Observer from 15 November 2001: SADDAM COMMENTS TO KURD COLLABORATOR GROUP
National Assembly of the Republic of Iraq: The Fifth National Assembly
National Assembly of the Republic of Iraq: Parliamentarians
 Los Angeles Times from 3 July 1989, page 12: Iraq Kurd Party Election

1947 births
Iraqi Kurdistani politicians
Iraqi Kurdish people
Living people
People from Dohuk Province

de:Ahmad Muhammad Said al-Atrushi